Liuvigild, Leuvigild, Leovigild, or Leovigildo (Spanish and Portuguese), ( 519 – 586) was a Visigothic King of Hispania and Septimania from 568 to 586. Known for his Codex Revisus or Code of Leovigild, a law allowing equal rights between the Visigothic and Hispano-Roman population, his kingdom covered modern Portugal and most of modern Spain down to Toledo. Liuvigild ranks among the greatest Visigothic kings of the Arian period.

Life, campaigns and reign
When the Visigothic king Athanagild died in 567, Liuva I was elevated to the kingship at a ceremony held in Narbonne, the last bastion of Visigothic rule. Recognizing the leadership qualities of his younger sibling, in the second year of his reign, King Liuva I declared his brother Liuvigild co-king and heir, assigning him Hispania Citerior, or the eastern part of Hispania (Spain), to directly rule over. Both co-regents were Arian Christians, which was the dominant religious faith of the Visigothic rulers until 587.

Liuvigild was married twice: first to Theodosia, who gave birth to two sons, Hermenegild and Reccared I, and after her death, to Athanagild's widow Goiswintha.

Almost every single year of his kingship, Liuvigild marched against the Byzantines, the Suebi, the Basques, or domestic competitors. According to the chronicle of John of Biclaro, as co-king Liuvigild initiated the first of several campaigns to expand the territory of the kingdom of the Visigoths, which Peter Heather describes as a "list of striking successes". Liuvigild's first campaign began against the Suebi in 569, during which he very quickly subdued Zamora, Palencia, and Leon. Then in 570 he attacked the district of Bastania Malagnefla (the ancient Bastetania), where he defeated imperial forces. In 570, Liuvigild "laid waste the region of Bastetania and the city of Málaga, defeating their soldiers". The following year he captured Medina Sidonia, assisted "through the treachery of a certain Framidaneus." Then, around the time he became sole ruler with the death of his brother Liuva (which occurred in either 571 or 572), seized Córdoba from the Byzantine Empire. Though constantly at war with the Byzantines in southern Hispania, Liuvigild accepted the administration of the Byzantine Empire, adopted its pomp and ceremony, the title Flavius, the throne, crown, scepter, and purple mantle, and subsequently struck gold coins in his own name to commemorate the event.

Determined to exact revenge upon Liuvigild and reclaim their territories, the Suebi invaded the regions of Plasencia and Coria, Las Hurdes, Batuecas, and the territory of the Riccones. Whilst preparing to check the imminent advance of the Suebi in 573, Liuvigild received news that his brother Liuva had died, which left him ruler over the entirety of the Visigothic dominions. Liuvigild made efforts to secure a peaceful succession, a perennial Visigothic issue, by associating his two sons, Hermenegild and Reccared, with himself in the kingly office and placing certain regions under their regencies; namely, making them dukes over Toledo and Narbonne. 

The Visigoths were still a military aristocracy and kings had to be formally ratified by the nobility. Visigoths and their Ibero-Roman subjects were still separated by religion and by distinct law codes. Liuvigild modified the old Code of Euric which governed the Goths and created his own Codex Revisus. He also repealed old Roman laws dating back to the late 4th century forbidding intermarriage between Visigoths and Ibero-Romans. Such marriages had once been considered a crime punishable by death. Through this action and others administrative moves, Liuvigild reassured his rule and when he had secured the capital, began a new campaign, during which he conquered the district of Sabaria, the province of Braganza, and Torre de Moncorvo along the Suebian frontier.

Gregory of Tours contended that Liuvigild exceeded his power when he divided the kingdom between his two sons, but it is feasible that he took this action to weaken the authority of the nobles from amid both the Visigoths and the Spanish-Romans. Whatever Liuvigild's original motivation was or whether this move to empower his children can be viewed as beyond his authority, the act stirred several insurrections— first among the Cantabri, then amid the people of Cordova and Asturia, and lastly in Toledo and Evora—at a time when the Suebi and Byzantines were planning attacks against Liuvigild. Undeterred by these manifold threats, he attended to the concerns within his empire and with his son Reccared's assistance, he succeeded in subduing the rebels who rose to oppose him. In doing so, he seized Ammaia, the capital of the Cantabri; he took the Asturian stronghold, Saldania (Saldana); he also successfully quelled insurgent activities in Toledo and Evora (Aebura Carpetana).  Not given to mercy—in every rebellious region—he sealed his victories by exacting terrible punishments upon his erstwhile enemies. Sometime during this campaign in 576, Liuvigild's  predominance led to the Suebian king Miro rapidly agreeing to a treaty which included paying tribute, if but for a short period.

In 577 Liuvigild marched into Orespeda, a region in southeastern Spain, and after suppressing an immediate revolt "of the common people" added this province to his kingdom. Upon the conclusion of these campaigns, Liuvigild celebrated his victories by founding a city in Celtiberia, which he named Recopolis for his son Reccared. In 582 Liuvigild then went on to capture Mérida, which had been under the political control of its popular bishop Masona since the early 570s. Over the course of his reign, Liuvigild had conquered most of the peninsula.

Hermenegild's Revolt
In 579, Hermenegild had converted to orthodox Christianity, persuaded by his Frankish wife Ingunthis and Leander, bishop of Seville. After his father, who considered this conversion treason, insisted on appointing Arians as bishops, Baetica revolted under the leadership of Hermenegild, who was supported by the orthodox bishops. Also on Hermenegild's side was none other than Pope Gregory the Great. Throughout the period of Hermenigild's religiously motivated sedition, Liuvigild sought various forms of theological reconciliation, including the acknowledgement of Catholic baptism (not forcing Arians to undergo a cleansing re-baptism upon conversion), tolerating the Catholic veneration of relics and saints, and softening the distinction between Christ and the Father by declaring them equals as opposed to the traditional Arian position, which held Christ as subordinate. These unifying religious efforts came to naught since Arianism was losing its intellectual appeal to Roman Catholic orthodoxy.

Hermenegild's revolt worried Liuvigild, as it raised concerns about his relations with the Merovingians; namely, since Ingund's brother, Childebert II—who had gained power following the death of his Merovingian father, Sigibert I—began taking an interest in the developments of his sister's realm. Attempting to counteract any possible Frankish support for the Hermengild's rebellion, Liuvigild pressed for a marriage between Reccared and Chilperic's daughter, Rigunth, which unfortunately proved diplomatically useless upon Chilperic's death.
 
During this father-son feud, Hermengild presented himself as a victim as he tried to forge alliances in the name of Catholicism. Despite having Pope Gregory's tacit support, contemporary Catholic writers—including Isidore of Seville and Gregory of Tours—expressed little to no sympathy for Hermenegild's revolt against his father.  When the Byzantines failed to send aid for the revolt, Liuvigild besieged and took Seville and in 584, banished his son to Valencia, where in 585, he was later murdered. Leander of Seville was also banished and later canonized as a saint. Hermenegild's wife Ingunthis was delivered to the Eastern Emperor Tiberius II Constantine and was last heard of in Africa. Pope Gregory held Liuvigild responsible for Hermengild's death and asserted that the latter died for his Catholic faith.

Later years

In 585, Liuvigild conquered the Suebi peoples, bringing an end to some forty-years of their independence in Spain. Despite several failed attempts by the Suebi to rebel against the Visigoths, Liuvigild eventually forced them to swear their fidelity. By the end of his reign, only the Basque lands and two small southern territories of the Byzantine Empire made up the non-Visigothic parts of Hispania. However, despite his best efforts, Liuvigild was unable to establish common religious ground between Arian Christians and those of the Catholic majority. Liuvigild's last year was troubled by open war with the Franks along his northernmost borders. But overall, Liuvigild was one of the more effective Visigothic kings of Hispania, the restorer of Visigothic unity, ruling from his capital newly established at Toledo, where he settled toward the end of his reign. (From this, the Hispanic Visigothic monarchy is sometimes called the "Kingdom of Toledo"). While successful, Liuvigild attained unity and royal authority only through conquest.

According to Gregory of Tours, Liuvigild fell ill in 586 and on his deathbed repented, wept for seven days  and "embraced the Catholic faith" before he "gave up the ghost." He was succeeded by his second son Reccared, who converted to Catholic Christianity in 589 and brought religious and political unity between the Visigoths and their subjects.

Visigothic legacy
The Visigoths in Hispania considered themselves the heirs of western Roman imperial power, not its enemies. Signs of this can be seen in their mimicry of Roman bureaucratic and administrative norms, such as tax collection and the institution of Roman-based laws. Further evidence of Visigothic affinity for all things Roman included the reestablishment of imperial style by Liuvigild, who recreated the royal regalia. Under Liuvigild, Spain was essentially unified and according to historian Chris Wickham, the "most Roman-influenced legislation of any of the barbarian kingdoms" was enacted. Throughout his reign, Liuvigild tried to find a compromise solution between Arian Christianity and Catholicism to no avail. However, important if not permanent changes in the Spanish realm came when Liuvigild's son Reccared aggressively promoted the Catholic faith at the expense of Arian Christianity, whereby he made Catholicism the official religion of the entire kingdom in 589.

Later successors to Liuvigild included the likes of King Chindasuinth (642–653) and his son Recceswinth (653–672), both of whom reformed Visigothic laws and legal codes that essentially eliminated the distinction between Romans and Goths and which permitted intermarriage between the two peoples. Challenge to Visigothic rule came abruptly in the form of Muslim Berbers led by Umayyad commander Tariq, whose forces defeated the Visigothic King Roderic in 711 and by 725, the Visigothic kingdom in Hispania was fully overwhelmed by Muslim invaders.

References

Notes

Citations

Bibliography

Further reading
E. A. Thompson, The Goths in Spain (1969).

External links

Visigothic kingdoms
Edward Gibbon, History of the Decline and Fall of the Roman Empire, Chapter 37.
 Coins of King Liuvigild

519 births
586 deaths
6th-century Visigothic monarchs
Gothic warriors